Ixodes brunneus is a species of tick in the genus Ixodes. It is normally a parasite of birds, but has also been recorded on the marsh rice rat (Oryzomys palustris).

See also
List of parasites of the marsh rice rat

References

Literature cited
Wilson, N. and Durden, L.A. 2003. Ectoparasites of terrestrial vertebrates inhabiting the Georgia Barrier Islands, USA: an inventory and preliminary biogeographical analysis (subscription required). Journal of Biogeography 30(8):1207–1220.

brunneus
Parasites of birds
Arachnids of North America
Animals described in 1844